Deborah Berke Partners is a New York City, based architecture and interior design firm founded and led by Deborah Berke, who concurrently serves as Dean of the  Yale School of Architecture.

Works

 Holcombe T. Green, Jr. Hall, Yale School of Art, New Haven, CT, 2000
48 Bond Street, New York City, NY, 2008
Irwin Union Bank, Columbus, IN, 2009
 21c Museum Hotel, Oklahoma City, OK, 2016
 Rockefeller Arts Center, SUNY Fredonia, Fredonia, NY, 2017
 Richardson Olmsted Complex, Buffalo, NY, 2017
 High Street Residence Hall, Dickinson College, 2018
 21c Museum Hotel, Chicago, IL, 2020
NXTHVN, New Haven, CT, 2020
 77 Greenwich Street, New York City, NY, 2021
 College 7 and College 8, Princeton University, Princeton, NJ, 2022

Gallery

References 

Architecture firms based in New York City
Companies based in Manhattan
Design companies established in 1982
1982 establishments in New York (state)